The Songs of the Tyne (or to give it its full title The Songs of the Tyne being a collection of Popular Local Songs Number 1 – published by William R Walker, Printer &c., Royal Arcade, Newcastle) is a Chapbook of Geordie folk song consisting of three small volumes, published between 1857 and 1866. (There is a slight difference on the cover of Volumes 2 & 3 which are "by W R Walker, Printer and Publisher"). This is the second of the series, a first series of ten chapbooks was published around 1850 by John Ross.

The publication 
William R Walker edited the three volumes of The Songs of the Tyne, a series of booklets containing "local" songs by local Tyneside composers, some well known at the time, others not.

A set of the original documents were kept in the archives of Newcastle University. They are published by the William R Walker, Printer and Publisher, Royal Arcade, Newcastle.

Contents 
The volumes and their contents are below :-

See also 
 Geordie dialect words

References

External links
 FARNE – Folk Archive Resource North East Songs of the Tyne by Walker
 Allan’s Illustrated Edition of Tyneside songs and readings

English folk songs
Songs related to Newcastle upon Tyne
Northumbrian folklore
Music books